The Copa MX (formerly called Copa Tower Monterrey, Copa Eliminatoria, Copa México and Copa Corona MX (for sponsorship reasons)) was a Mexican football cup competition that was established in 1907. After a lengthy hiatus that began in 1997,  it was restored in 2012. 

On early editions of the cup, it consisted of both professional and amateur stages. It was the first official tournament that included teams from different parts of Mexico and was considered a prestigious tournament, especially during its earlier years of existence. The original purpose of the competition was to determine a national champion, thus distinguishing it from the local league championship. Its format was different from the local leagues as well, as it employed direct elimination and culminated in a final that received much more fanfare than the local leagues.

The cup has twice been placed on hiatus by the Mexican Football Federation – between 1976 and 1988 and between 1992 and 1994 – with the 1997 edition of the tournament being the last time the Copa México was held before it was placed on an indefinite hiatus. In May 2012, Liga MX president Decio de María announced the return and rebranding of the tournament. It is currently -once again- on indefinite hiatus after the 2019-2020 edition, due to a busy calendar.

History

Copa Tower (1907–1919) 

The Copa México began in 1907 with the donation of the trophy by Reginald Tower, who was at the time the British ambassador to Mexico. For this reason, it was originally called the Copa Tower. At first, the tournament only included clubs from Mexico City and the surrounding areas. Pachuca won the inaugural tournament, in 1908, by defeating Reforma AC in the final. In 1919, Real España won the cup for the third year straight and were allowed to keep the trophy permanently. In all, the Copa Tower was contested 11 times, with Real España winning it four times in all, the best performance of the period.

Copa Eliminatoria (1919–1932) 
In 1920, the tournament took place for the first time with a new trophy, the Copa Eliminatoria. It was contested six times between the years 1920 and 1926. Asturias F.C. won it three times during this period (consecutively from 1922 to 1924), the highest total of any team during this period.

Copa México (1932–1997)

Amateur Period (1932–1943) 
After the foundation of the Federación Mexicana de Fútbol in 1927, a new trophy, named the Copa México, was donated in 1932. Following a six-year hiatus, the cup was contested again during the 1932–33 season. This time, the competition also received official support of President Lázaro Cárdenas. The first Copa México was won by Necaxa in a tournament of historical importance due to the adoption of new rules. This marked the beginning of an 11-year period that is referred to in retrospect as the Amateur Period. Once again, Asturias F.C. dominated the championship, winning it a record 5 times during this period.

Professional Period (1943–1997) 
In 1943 the Professional Period of the Copa México began, a period that would last until the competition's termination in 1997. At first, it was played among teams from the then-Liga Mayor, the present-day Primera Division de Mexico. Beginning in 1950 the teams of the Segunda División de México were also included into the competition with the exception of the 1956–57, 1963–64, 1994–95 and 1995–96 seasons.

Copa MX (2012–2021)

Semi-annual format (2012–2016) 
Upon its return in 2012, the newly rebranded Copa MX was played twice a year, concurrent with the two league tournaments.  In the Fall tournament, 14 of the Liga MX teams not involved in the CONCACAF Champions League, play alongside 14 of the Ascenso MX teams.  The 14 Ascenso MX teams were the 13 top point-earners from the season prior, plus the newly relegated team.  The teams were placed into 7 groups of 4.  The 7 group winners, plus the group runner-up with the highest point total, moved on to the quarterfinals.

Teams played 6 games in the group stage. Groups and home field advantage were determined by a blind draw.  For the group draw, 1st division teams were placed in Pot A, while 2nd division teams were placed in Pot B.  In the home field advantage draw, no team can have more than 2 home games in the group stage.  A blind draw determined home field advantage in the knockout rounds.

In the Spring tournament, the 11 Liga MX teams not involved in international tournaments, played alongside the 13 Ascenso MX teams with the highest point total from the previous short tournament.   Both tournaments will have the same draw format and number of group games.  KO rounds for both tournaments will be single-elimination.

Revised semi-annual format (2016–2019)
The new format was played twice a year, concurrent with the two league tournaments.  In the Fall tournament, all Liga MX clubs will play alongside 12 of the Ascenso MX teams.  The 12 Ascenso MX teams will be the 11 top point-earners from the season prior, plus the newly relegated team.  The teams will be placed into 8 groups of 3.  The 8 group winners, plus the 8 group runners-up, move on to the new round (round of 16).

Teams will play 4 games in the group stage. Groups and home field advantage will be determined the draw by public at their annual draft.  For the group draw, 1st division teams top 4 point-earners and 2nd division teams top 4 point-earners will be placed in Pot A, while 1st division teams mid 4 point-earners and 2nd division teams mid 4 point-earners will be placed in Pot B and 1st division teams last 4 point-earners and 2nd division teams last 4 point-earners will be placed in Pot C. In the home field advantage draw, teams can have 2 home games in the group stage.  A blind draw will determine home field advantage in the KO rounds.

Annual format (2019–2022)
From 2019 to 2020 season, the Copa MX will be played as a single tournament throughout the season. It will have the participation of 27 teams (15 of Liga MX and 12 of Ascenso MX) place into 9 groups of 3. Respect to the development of the tournament, this maintains most of he 2016 format, except the division in 2 tournaments per year. The group stage will be played between July and December, and the final stage will be played between January and April.

List of finals

Amateur era (1907–1943)

Copa Tower

Copa Eliminatoria

Copa Mexico

Professional era (1943–1997) 

1: On away goals

Copa MX

Performance by club

Amateur era

Professional era

Performance by Club

See also

SuperCopa MX

References

External links
Official site
Mexico - List of Cup Winners, RSSSF.com

 
Mexico
Football competitions in Mexico